On October 9, 2015, Steven Edward Jones, an 18-year-old freshman at Northern Arizona University, shot four people, killing Colin Charles Brough and severely injuring three others, in a parking lot outside of Mountain View Hall on the Flagstaff Mountain campus in Flagstaff, Arizona.

Jones was charged with one count of first-degree murder and three counts of aggravated assault. He pleaded not guilty, taking responsibility for the shooting but claiming that he acted in self-defense. After a 2017 mistrial, Jones pleaded guilty to one count of manslaughter and three counts of aggravated assault before the retrial was scheduled to begin. On February 11, 2020, Jones was sentenced to six years in prison.

Shooting
At approximately 1:20 AM on the morning of Friday, October 9, 2015, in a parking lot near Mountain View Hall on the Flagstaff Mountain campus of Northern Arizona University in Flagstaff, Arizona, 18-year-old freshman Steven Jones shot four 20-year-old juniors with a .40-caliber Glock 22, killing Colin Brough and severely injuring Nicholas Piring, Nicholas Prato, and Kyle Zientek.

The shooting occurred after a dispute occurred between a group of three pledges of the Sigma Chi fraternity, including Jones, and a group of three members of Delta Chi, including Brough. Jones testified that the Delta Chi members had assaulted him and threatened his life, though witnesses disputed his claim.

All four victims were intoxicated, while Jones had no drugs or alcohol in his system at the time of the shooting.

Perpetrator
Steven Edward Jones (born 1996 or 1997) was raised in Glendale, Arizona, a suburb of Phoenix. He is the only child of Warren and Rose Anna Jones. Before college, he was homeschooled.

Aftermath

Trial
Jones' trial began on April 5, 2017 at the Coconino County Superior Courthouse in Flagstaff, Arizona. Thirty-eight witnessess, all three surviving victims, and Jones himself testified. The jury began deliberation on April 25, though they were unable to reach a verdict, and a mistrial was declared on May 2.

A retrial was originally scheduled for August 1, but five delays postponed it until February 2020. In December 2017, prosecutors agreed to reduce the charge to second-degree murder, in part to avoid double jeopardy. On January 9, 2020, Jones pleaded guilty to one count of manslaughter and three counts of aggravated assault, one month prior to the scheduled retrial. On February 11, he was sentenced to six years in prison. Jones is currently located at the Red Rock Correctional Center in Eloy, Arizona.

Nicholas Acevedo, one of the 38 witnesses in the original trial, died of suicide on March 4, 2018, prior to the retrial's scheduled date. His parents, Steve and Karen Acevedo, believed that the trial had contributed to his suicide.

Civil suit
On June 30, 2017, a civil lawsuit for negligence was filed against Jones and his parents by Piring, Prato, and Brough's parents, Douglas and Claudia Brough. The case was dismissed in January 2018, after the parties reached a confidential settlement.

See also
 Gun violence in the United States
 List of school shootings in the United States

References

University and college shootings in the United States
2015 in Arizona
2015 murders in the United States
2015 mass shootings in the United States
Mass shootings in Arizona
Murder in Arizona
Events in Coconino County, Arizona
Flagstaff, Arizona